The Great Flood of 1862 was the largest flood in the recorded history of Oregon, Nevada, and California, occurring from December 1861 to January 1862. It was preceded by weeks of continuous rains and snows in the very high elevations that began in Oregon in November 1861 and continued into January 1862. This was followed by a record amount of rain from January 9–12, and contributed to a flood that extended from the Columbia River southward in western Oregon, and through California to San Diego, and extended as far inland as Idaho in the Washington Territory, Nevada and Utah in the Utah Territory, and Arizona in the western New Mexico Territory. Immense snowfalls in the mountains of far western North America caused more flooding in Idaho, Arizona, New Mexico, as well as in Baja California and Sonora, Mexico the following spring and summer, as the snow melted.

The event was capped by a warm intense storm that melted the high snow load. The resulting snow-melt flooded valleys, inundated or swept away towns, mills, dams, flumes, houses, fences, and domestic animals, and ruined fields. It has been described as the worst disaster ever to strike California. The storms caused approximately $100 million (1861 USD) in damage, approximately equal to $3.117 billion (2021 USD). The governor, state legislature, and state employees were not paid for a year and a half. At least 4,000 people were estimated to have been killed in the floods in California, which was roughly 1% of the state population at the time.

Background 
The weather pattern that caused this flood was not from an El Niño-type event, and from the existing  Army and private weather records, it has been determined that the polar jet stream was to the north, as the Pacific Northwest experienced a mild rainy pattern for the first half of December 1861. In 2012, hydrologists and meteorologists concluded that the precipitation was likely caused by a series of atmospheric rivers that hit the Western United States along the entire West Coast, from Oregon to Southern California.

With the right dynamics in place to provide lift, an atmospheric river can produce astonishing amounts of precipitation, especially if it stalls over an area for any length of time.

The floods followed a 20-year-long drought. During November, prior to the flooding, Oregon had steady but heavier-than-normal rainfall, with heavier snow in the mountains. Researchers believe the jet stream had slipped south, accompanied by freezing conditions reported at Oregon stations by December 25. Heavy rainfall began falling in California as the longwave trough moved south over the state, remaining there until the end of January 1862, causing precipitation to fall everywhere in the state for nearly 40 days. Eventually, the trough moved even further south, causing snow to fall in the Central Valley and surrounding mountain ranges (15 feet of snow in the Sierra Nevada).

Impact by region

Oregon 
There was an excessive amount of precipitation in November 1861 over most of Oregon, less so in the extreme northwest. It was cold enough at the higher elevations that much snow fell in the Cascade Range, which, when later melted by the warm rains produced a great quantity of water that flooded into the Willamette River and other streams in the Cascades. Tributaries of the Willamette originating in the Oregon Coast Range did not rise as high. A tropical depression that came in at the beginning of December produced strong, warm southerly winds in Oregon, with extremely heavy rain. Flooding was heaviest on rivers with tributaries arising from the snow-covered Cascade Range. The crest of the Willamette flood was reached at Salem on December 3; at Oregon City on the 4th; at Milwaukie, between Oregon City and Portland, on the 5th; at Albany on December 8. The crests at Albany and Salem were the highest ever known at any time. In Oregon, the flood was one of the largest in the recorded history of the Willamette Valley and the rest of Western Oregon.

An article in the December 14, 1861, Oregon City Argus, described the course of the flood at Oregon City:

{{blockquote|During the month of November the rain had been falling almost continuously, and a vast amount of snow must have accumulated in the mountains...
Tuesday evening a gloom settled on a scene such as probably never was witnessed in our Valley before. The ceaseless roar of the stream made a fearful elemental music widely different from the ordinary monotone of the Falls; while the darkness was only made more visible by the glare of torches and hurrying lights, which with the shouts of people from the windows of houses surrounded by the water, all conspired to render the hour one of intense and painful excitement. The flood has covered the highest mark of January '53, and is still rapidly rising. As late as anything could be seen the mills were still standing, but the insatiate monster is still creeping up inch by inch, winding its swelling folds round the pillars and foundations of all the houses in its way, crushing and grinding them in the maw of destruction, and sweeping the broken fragments into a common vortex of ruin. All night as on the night previous, people whose homes were being invaded hurried to places of security, glad to escape even with the sacrifice of all their goods.The light of Wednesday morning revealed a scene of desolation terrible in its extent no less than in its completeness. The Oregon City and Island Mills, Willamette Iron Works, Foundry and Machine Shop were all gone...}}

Flood waters were so high that at Oregon City at the flood's crest on December 5, the steamer St. Clair was able to run the falls, and steamers were able to visit points at some distance from the normal river channel. Although large amounts of wheat and flour were swept away, some was recovered when Oregon City's Island Mill was found on Sauvie Island downriver from Portland. The nearby town of Linn City was completely destroyed by flooding and was not rebuilt. The flood destroyed the historic towns of Champoeg, site of the first provisional government in Oregon, and Orleans, across the Willamette River from Corvallis. Neither was rebuilt.

The flooding was also severe in other parts of Oregon; to the south, the Umpqua River had the greatest flood known even to the oldest Native Americans, and water was  higher than the 1853 flood. It rose from November 3 to December 3, subsided for two days, then rose again until the 9th. At Fort Umpqua, communication upriver was cut off above Scottsburg, and the river was full of floating houses, barns, rails and produce. The Coquille River swept away settlers' property and there was also great damage on the Rogue River and on other small streams."

Economic losses from flood damage were severe, as the rivers in Oregon were the main routes of travel. The riverfront was the building site of mills, freight depots, and storehouses for grain and other foodstuffs. Business houses and many residences were near the landings. Farm buildings were mostly on sites convenient to the rivers and supplies of feed for livestock. Loss of so much wheat flour and the new demand coming since 1860 from the recently opened Idaho gold fields caused a spike in its price from $7 to $12 per barrel.

 Idaho 
In the interior of Washington Territory, in what is now Idaho, the storm creating the flood in Oregon dumped its precipitation as an unprecedented snowfall. Flooding on the Columbia River and the snow in the mountains closed off supplies to the new mining towns on the Salmon River, causing starvation among the miners of Florence, cut off from December until May 1862. By early July, as the heavy burden of snow in the mountains finally melted, the runoff caused great flooding. The Boise River flooded from extremely high runoff and is believed to have been four times larger than its largest recorded flood in 1943. Flood waters made the river expand to a couple of miles wide. It washed away or covered the original route of the Oregon Trail in the river valley.

 California 
California was hit by a combination of incessant rain, snow, and then unseasonally high temperatures. In Northern California, it snowed heavily during the later part of November and the first few days of December, when the temperature rose unusually high, until it began to rain. In San Francisco, there were 35 inches of precipitation in December 1861-January 1862, and almost 50 for the season.  There were four distinct rainy periods: The first occurred on December 9, 1861, the second on December 23–28, the third on January 9–12, and the fourth on January 15–17. Native Americans knew that the Sacramento Valley could become an inland sea when the rains came. Their storytellers described water filling the valley from the Coast Range to the Sierra.

 Northern California 
Fort Ter-Waw, located in Klamath Glen, California, was destroyed by the flood in December 1861 and abandoned on June 10, 1862. Bridges were washed away in Trinity and Shasta counties.

At Weaverville, John Carr was a witness to the sudden melt of snow by the heavy rain and onset of the flood in December 1861 on the Trinity River:

Two years later William H. Brewer saw near Crescent City, the debris of the flood:

 Central Valley 
The entire Sacramento and San Joaquin valleys were inundated. Transportation, mail, and communications across the state were disrupted for a month. Water covered portions of the valley from December 1861, through the spring, and into the summer of 1862.

The bridge spanning the river initially withstood the flood waters but was destroyed when the debris of the bridge at Two-Mile Bar, only a short distance up river, torn from its foundation, crashed into the Knights Ferry Bridge, crushing the truss supports and knocking it from its rock foundation. All Sacramento, excepting one street, part of Marysville, part of Santa Rosa, part of Auburn, part of Sonora, part of Nevada City, and part of Napa were under water. Some smaller towns like Empire City and Mokelumne City were entirely destroyed.

 Sacramento 

By 1861, the Sacramento flood plain had quickly become inhabited by a growing population during the Gold Rush, and had begun to serve as the central hub for Valley commerce and trade and as the home of the California State Legislature. The landscape was recognized as a flood-prone landscape located at the confluence of the American and Sacramento River. John Muir noted the extent of seasonal flooding in Sacramento, "…The greatest floods occur in winter, when one could suppose all the wild waters would be muffled and chained in frost and snow…rare intervals warm rains and warm winds invade the mountains and push back the snow line from 2000 to 8,000 feet, or even higher, and then come the big floods."

However, the series of storms that led to the Great Flood of 1862 averaged precipitation levels that records show only occur once every 500 to 1,000 years. The geographical range of flooding in the state was noted by a traveling geologist from Yale University, William Brewer, who wrote that on January 19, 1862,

From December to January 1862 the series of storms carrying high winds and heavy precipitation left city streets and sidewalks underwater. Photographs show  canals in place of city streets and boats docked to storefronts.

On Inauguration Day, January 10, 1862, the state's eighth governor, Leland Stanford, traveled by rowboat to his inauguration building held at the State Legislature office. Much of Sacramento remained under water for 3 months after the storms passed. As a result of the flooding, from January 23, 1862, the state capital was moved temporarily from Sacramento to San Francisco.

Levee damage

The city of Sacramento suffered the worst damage due to its levee, which lay in a wide and flat valley at the junction of the American and Sacramento rivers. When the floodwaters entered from the higher ground on the east, the levee acted as a dam to keep the water in the city rather than let it flow out. Soon the water level was  higher inside than the level of the Sacramento River on the outside.

John Carr wrote of his riverboat trip up the Sacramento River when it was at one of its highest stages of flood:

Dozens of wood houses, some two stories high, were simply lifted up and carried off by the flood, as was "all the firewood, most of the fences and sheds, all the poultry, cats, rats and many of the cows and horses". The Chinese in their poorly built shantytowns were disproportionately affected.

Eventually the waters fell to a level on a par with the lowest part of the city.

City rebuilding

Politicians addressed the flood risk with an investment of more than $1.5 million in flood control and prevention through an improved levee system around Sacramento and the greater Sacramento area.

Sacramento put efforts into restructuring the city's foundation by re-channeling the American River, reinforcing the established levee system, and passing a two-decade project to raise the city above flood level. Due to the high costs associated with flood recovery, the city of Sacramento reached out to the aid of the Transcontinental Railroad Co., which was a major turning point in levee resilience and reconstruction. Prior to the great flood, levee breaks and failures caused much destruction from flooding. The Transcontinental Railroad had laid tracks across the Sierra Nevada and stationed its major repair and production line in Sacramento. The Chinese workforce of over 14,000 reconstructed levees under the guidance of Charles Crocker, the head contractor for Central Pacific Railroad.

In response to a weak levee system and seasonal flooding, flood plain architecture was incorporated in residential infrastructure, evident in Victorian buildings throughout Midtown to Downtown Sacramento. Flood design includes raised front porches with stairs leading down to the street. In addition, small hollow spaces are built into the basement level to allow for basement flooding and aeration.

Old Town Sacramento was raised 15 feet above flood level. Ruins of the old city remain underneath the streets as tunnels leading nowhere, with hollow sidewalks, filled in entrances, trap doors, and rubble where storefronts and walkways used to be. Large wooden beams and soil brought in from surrounding areas helped to stabilize and build a foundation on top of the once-flooded city.

 Southern California 
In Southern California, beginning on December 24, 1861, it rained for 28 days in Los Angeles.  In the San Gabriel Mountains the mining town of Eldoradoville was washed away by flood waters. The flooding drowned thousands of cattle and washed away fruit trees and vineyards that grew along the Los Angeles River. No mail was received at Los Angeles for five weeks. The Los Angeles Star'' reported that:

The plains of Los Angeles County, at the time a marshy area with many small lakes and several meandering streams from the mountains, were extensively flooded, and much of the agricultural development that lay along the rivers was ruined. In most of the lower areas, small settlements were submerged. These flooded areas formed into a large lake system with many small streams. A few more powerful currents cut channels across the plain and carried the runoff to the sea.

In February 1862, the Los Angeles, San Gabriel, and Santa Ana Rivers merged.

At Santa Barbara County, the narrow coastal plains were flooded by the rivers coming out of the mountains. The San Buenaventura Mission Aqueduct that was still drawing water from a tributary of the Ventura River for the town of Ventura water system, was abandoned due to the damage in the area that became the separate Ventura County in 1873.

In San Bernardino County, all the fertile riverside fields and all but the church and one house of the New Mexican colony of Agua Mansa, were swept away by the Santa Ana River, which overflowed its banks. A local priest rang the church bell on the night of January 22, 1862, alerting the inhabitants to the approach of the flood, and all escaped.

In San Diego, a storm at sea backed up the flood water running into the bay from the San Diego River, resulting in a new river channel cut into San Diego Harbor. The continuous heavy downpour also changed the look of the land, the previously rounded hills were extensively cut by gulleys and canyons.

To the north, in the Owens Valley, similar snow and flooding conditions as those to the east in Aurora, Nevada (see below), led to the local Paiute suffering the loss of much of the game they depended on. Cattle, newly driven into the valley to feed the miners, competed with the native grazers and ate the native wild plant crops the Paiute depended on to survive. Starving, the Paiute began to kill the cattle and conflict with the cattlemen began, leading to the subsequent Owens Valley Indian War.

Economic impact 
In March 1862, the Wool Growers Association reported that 100,000 sheep and 500,000 lambs were killed by the floods. Even oyster beds in San Francisco Bay near Oakland were reported to be dying from the effects of the immense amounts of freshwater entering the bay. Full of sediment, it covered the oyster beds.  One-quarter of California's estimated 800,000 cattle were killed by the flood, accelerating the end of the cattle-based ranchero society. One-fourth to one-third of the state's property was destroyed, and one home in eight was carried away or ruined by the flood-waters. Mining equipment such as sluices, flumes, wheels and derricks were carried away across the state.

An early estimate of property damage was $10 million. However, later it was estimated that approximately one-quarter of the taxable real estate in the state of California was destroyed in the flood. The state almost had to declare bankruptcy due to the costs of the damage and the loss of tax revenue.

Nevada 
The Carson River Basin of the eastern California and western Utah Territory (now Nevada), suffered from a similar pattern of flooding. Flooding began in December 1861 in Carson Valley from a series of storms in the upper Carson River basin.  of wet heavy snow fell on December 20, 1861, accumulating on the valley floor. Snow was followed by a period of very cold temperatures which froze the snow, followed by a three-day rain starting on December 25, 1861. By January 2, 1862, the town of Dayton and the area surrounding it had been flooded.

In the vicinity of Aurora, there had been light snowfall in November, then mild weather until Christmas Eve, when there began a heavy and rapid snowfall for days. The temperature dropped below zero and the passes over the Sierra were closed. During the second week of January, it warmed slightly, and the snow became a torrential rain. Esmerelda and Willow gulches overflowed their banks and flooded Aurora. After a week, it cooled again, and snow began to fall again. Within a few days, the snow was deeper than it had been before the rains had begun to fall. Samuel Young of Aurora recorded in his diary that the snow and rain had fallen for 26 days out of 30 since December 24, 1861.

Utah 
The early southwestern Utah settlements in Washington County:  Fort Clara, St. George, Grafton, Duncans Retreat, Adventure, and Northrop were nearly destroyed by a flood on the Virgin and Santa Clara Rivers, that followed 44 days of rainfall in January and February 1862.   Survivors of Fort Clara established the modern town of Santa Clara a mile east of the old fort on the Santa Clara River.  Springdale and Rockville were founded in 1862 by settlers flooded out of Adventure, Northup and other places in the vicinity. Settlers were driven from Fort Harmony in Iron County when the fort had to be abandoned after most of its adobe walls were washed away. The settlements of New Harmony and Kanarraville were then created by refugees from this disaster.

Arizona 
In western New Mexico Territory, heavy rains fell in late January, causing severe flooding of the Colorado River and Gila River. At 1 o’clock on the morning of January 23, the river reached its crest. Jaeger City a mile down river from Fort Yuma, and Colorado City, across the Colorado River from it were washed away. The riverside home of steamboat entrepreneur George Alonzo Johnson and the nearby Hooper residence were the only places in the town unharmed because they were built on high ground. Colorado City had to be rebuilt on higher ground after the 1862 flood.

The Gila River also flooded, covering its whole valley at its mouth where it met the Colorado from the sand hills on the south to the foothills on the north.  to the east of Fort Yuma, it swept away most of the mining boomtown of Gila City along with a supply of hay being gathered there to supply the planned advance of the California Column into Confederate Arizona. Further east the road was flooded, buildings and vehicles swept away and traffic was disrupted for some time thereafter by the mud covering the road to Tucson. The great flood in the Gila and Colorado rivers, covered their bottom lands with mud. Much of the livestock along the rivers drowned and the crops of the Indians along the river were destroyed.

New Mexico 
The great snow pack laid down during the winter of 1861–62, in the southern Rocky Mountains, and other ranges, the sources of the Rio Grande, caused a great spring flood in that river that changed its course in the Mesilla Valley. The flood also impeded the operations of the California Column attempting to cut off the retreating Confederate Army of New Mexico. On July 8, 1862, Lt. Col. Edward E. Eyre, First California Volunteer Cavalry wrote:

Instead of crossing at Messilla, the high waters and course change forced Eyers detachment to cross the Rio Grande, up river at the old San Diego Crossing below Fort Thorn, after waiting another week for the water to go down, which allowed the rearguard of the Confederate Army to escape into Texas. Messilla, built on the west bank of the Rio Grande after the Mexican–American War, was left by the movement of the river on its east bank where it remains today.

Sonora, Mexico 
Until the Great Flood of 1862, what became Port Isabel Slough, in Sonora, Mexico, was a shallow tidewater slough, but the extreme flood waters of that year cut its channel much deeper, so that at low tide it still was three fathoms deep. The mouth of this slough was only  from the mouth of the river and sheltered from the extremes of the tidal bore of the Colorado River and deep enough to prevent stranding on shoals or mud flats at low tide.  This made it an ideal anchorage for maritime craft to load and unload their cargo and passengers from the steamboats that took them up and down river without the danger from the tides that they were having to risk in the estuary at Robinson's Landing.

In the month of March 1865, the schooner Isabel, from San Francisco, commanded by W. H. Pierson, found and entered this slough and discharged her cargo there for the first time. The port lasted until 1878. After the Southern Pacific Railroad reached Yuma, it was abandoned the following year, the shipyard there being removed to Yuma.

Current interest 

The storm was not an unprecedented occurrence. Geologic evidence has been found that massive floods, of equal or greater magnitude to the 1861–1862 event, have occurred in California roughly every 100 to 200 years. The United States Geological Survey has developed a hypothetical scenario, known as the "ARkStorm", that would occur should a similar event occur in modern-day California. If such a storm were to occur today, it would probably cause over $725 billion to $1 trillion in damage.  The likelihood of a massive flooding event is estimated to have been increased due to climate change.

See also

California flood of 1605 – The largest known flood to strike California, significantly larger than the 1861–62 event
List of floods
Floods in the United States before 1901
List of natural disasters in the United States

References

Further reading

External links 
 
Tom Philpott, Mother Jones, 2020-08-26. "The Biblical Flood That Will Drown California"

1862
1861 floods in the United States
1862 floods in the United States
Natural disasters in Idaho
Natural disasters in Nevada
Natural disasters in Oregon
Natural disasters in Utah
Natural disasters in Arizona
History of the West Coast of the United States
History of Southern California
History of Inyo County, California
1862 in California
1862 in New Mexico Territory
1862 in Utah Territory
1862 in Washington Territory
1862 natural disasters in the United States